The Toyota B engine family was a series of inline-four diesel engines.

Toyota also had a 3.4 L (3389 cc) inline-six gasoline engine from 1937 to 1947 that was also called the B engine.  The earlier engine was used in early Toyota cars and trucks and in the first version of the Land Cruiser when it was known as the BJ Jeep.  The later engine was used in later versions of the Land Cruiser.  The two engines are unrelated and were not made at the same time.

Toyota made 5 generations of the B family engines, each one identified with a number before the B letter. Also, Toyota uses a series of letters to identify technical improvements to their engines:

- The number 1 (one) before the number of the engine model means that the engine uses direct injection, otherwise, indirect injection

- The F letter after the B letter means that the engine is multivalvular. Since the B family are inline-fours, that means that the engine uses 16 valves.

- The T letter, means that the engine is turbocharged

- The E letter, means that the engine is electronically controlled  engine control unit (ECU)

For example, the 15B-FTE Engine is the fifth generation of the B engines, comes with 16 valves, is turbocharged, direct-injected and uses an ECU.

Features at a glance

B

The B is a 3.0 L inline-four eight-valve OHV diesel engine. Compression ratio is 21:1. Output is 80 hp (60 kW) at 3,600 rpm with 141 lb·ft (191 N·m) of torque at 2,200 rpm, although later versions claim .

Applications
 Land Cruiser 40
 Dyna 3rd, 4th, 5th generation
 Toyoace 5th generation
 Daihatsu Delta V9/V12-series
 1978-19?? Hino Ranger 2 (V10)

2B

The 2B is a 3.2 L inline 4 eight valve OHV diesel engine. Compression ratio is 21:1. Output is 93 hp (69 kW) at 2,200 rpm with 159 ft·lbf (215 N·m) of torque at 2,200 rpm.

Applications
 Land Cruiser (BJ41/44 JDM)
 Coaster (BB10/11/15)

3B

The 3B is a 3.4 L inline 4 eight valve OHV diesel engine. Compression ratio is 20:1. Output is 90 hp (67 kW) at 3,500 rpm with 160 ft·lbf (217 N·m) of torque at 2,000 rpm.

Applications
 Dyna 4th, 5th, 6th generation
 Toyoace 4th, 5th generation
 Landcruiser 40/60/70
 Coaster 2nd, 3rd generation

4B

The 4B is a 3.7-litre inline-four eight-valve OHV diesel engine of the swirl chamber type. A direct-injection version later appeared, called the 14B.

11B

Same as the B but with direct injection.

13B

Same as the 3B but with direct injection.

13B-T
The 13B-T is a turbocharged version of the 13B engine, with a compression ratio of 17.6:1. Output is 120 hp (89 kW) at 3,400 rpm with 159 ft·lbf (217 N·m) of torque at 2,200 rpm.

Applications

 Land Cruiser (BJ71&74)

14B

Same as the 4B but with direct injection. The 14B is a 3.7-liter inline-four eight-valve OHV direct injection diesel engine. Compression ratio is 18:1. Output is 98 hp (72 kW) at 3,400 rpm with 177 lb·fts (240 N·m) of torque at 1,800 rpm.

Applications
 Toyota Bandeirante
 Daihatsu Delta V11-series

14B-T
The 14B-T is a turbocharged version of the 14B engine.

Applications
 Dyna/Toyoace

15B

15B-F
The 15B-F is a 4.1 L (4104 cc) inline 4 cylinder, sixteen valve, OHV, direct injection diesel engine (same configuration as the 15B-FTE but no turbo and intercooler). Bore is 108 mm and stroke is 112 mm.

Applications
 1993-1999 Coaster (4×4 BB58)
 1996-1999 Toyota Dyna BU112

15B-FT

The 15B-FT is a 4.1 L (4104 cc) inline 4 cylinder, sixteen valve, OHV, mechanical injection, turbo, intercooled diesel engine. Bore is 108 mm and stroke is 112 mm.

Applications
 05/1995-12/2002 Dyna (BU212L-TKMRX3)
 1999-2003 Coaster (4×4 BB58)
 1996-1999 Mega Cruiser (4×4 BXD20)
 Toyota Mega Cruiser (BXD10 military vehicle)

15B-FTE
The 15B-FTE is a 4.1 L (4104 cc) inline 4 cylinder, sixteen valve, OHV, electronic direct injection, turbo, intercooled diesel engine. Bore is 108 mm and stroke is 112 mm, with a compression ratio of 17.8:1.

Applications
 1999-2001 Mega CruiserBXD20 
 2003-2006 Coaster (BB50-BB58)
 Mega Cruiser (BXD10 military vehicle)
 1999-2011 Hino Dutro

1BZ-FPE

The 1BZ-FPE is basically a spark-ignited equivalent to the 15B-F and fitted to LPG-fueled versions of the Dyna and the Coaster in selected Asian markets.

References

B
Diesel engines by model
Straight-four engines